The 3rd Criterium of Polish Speedway League Aces was the 1984 version of the Criterium of Polish Speedway Leagues Aces. It took place on March 25 in the Polonia Stadium in Bydgoszcz, Poland.

Starting positions draw 

 Zdzisław Rutecki - Polonia Bydgoszcz
 Zenon Kasprzak - Unia Leszno
 Eugeniusz Błaszak - Stal Rzeszów
 Ryszard Fabiszewski - Polonia Bydgoszcz
 Bolesław Proch - Polonia Bydgoszcz
 Edward Jancarz - Stal Gorzów Wlkp.
 Jerzy Rembas - Stal Gorzów Wlkp.
 Marek Kępa - Start Gniezno
 Eugeniusz Miastkowski - Apator Toruń
 Zenon Plech - Wybrzeże Gdańsk
 Ryszard Buśkiewicz - Polonia Bydgoszcz
 Andrzej Huszcza - Falubaz Zielona Góra
 Roman Jankowski - Unia Leszno
 Maciej Jaworek - Falubaz Zielona Góra
 Wojciech Żabiałowicz - Apator Toruń
 Leonard Raba - Kolejarz Opole
 (R1) Marek Makowski - GKM Grudziądz
 (R2) Marek Ziarnik - Polonia Bydgoszcz

Heat details

Sources 
 Roman Lach - Polish Speedway Almanac

See also 

Criterium of Aces
Criterium of Aces
1984